XHGX-FM is a radio station on 92.5 FM in San Luis de la Paz, Guanajuato. XHGX carries the La Mejor grupera format from MVS Radio.

History

XHGX began as XEGX-AM 1480, which received its concession on July 30, 1969. It later moved to 800 kHz.

After steady power increases over the years, XEGX migrated to FM in 2011 on 92.5 MHz.

References

Radio stations in Guanajuato
Radio stations established in 1969